Oru is a settlement in Ida-Viru county, Estonia, surrounded by the Toila Parish but administered as an exclave district of the town of Kohtla-Järve which is located about  to the west of Oru. The settlement was founded in connection with the construction of a plant producing peat briquettes in 1958. The population was 1266 according to the 2011 census.

Oru has a station on Edelaraudtee's eastern route.

Oru should not be confused with the Toila-Oru Park located in nearby Toila, which was also the location of Oru Palace.